Doña Montserrat Lopez Memorial High School, also referred to by the acronym DMLMHS, is a public national high school in Silay City, Negros Occidental, Philippines. It is one of the leading secondary schools in the Philippines, and one of the biggest in terms of student population The school has one extension, Doña Montserrat Lopez Memorial High School - Capitan Ramon, which it is the rural version of the school.

History
The school was initially one of the political plans of Jose Maravilla, a former politician in Silay City. The plan was raised to his platforms inasmuch as the city didn't have any public high school. Unfortunately, Maravilla lost, but the plan was recognized and approved by the city council under the incumbency of then-Mayor Natalio G. Velez. The school was established on July 8, 1968 with its first principal Mr. Marcelo Jalando-on. At that time, the school was located at the backyard of the Silay South Elementary School. It was envisioned to accommodate poor but deserving elementary school graduates, and consequently offered free tuition. In 1972, Mrs. Amparo Ledesma became the principal of the school, after Jalando-on transferred to La Carlota City College as its new prexy. On July 1, 1975, the school earned its national status and was renamed as Silay City National High School. In 1979, Don Claudio Lopez donated almost 7 hectares of land along the national highway of Brgy. Rizal; the present location of the school. The school later changed its name to Doña Montserrat Lopez Memorial High School, in honor of the donor's wife.

Present

Fire Incident 
On November 11, 2018, a fire razed the school destroying eight classrooms. The said fire erupted at 5 p.m. and lasted 25 minutes, which the fire immediately spread to nearby classrooms. According to the Bureau of Fire Protection (BFP), the fire induced by defective electrical wiring, left approximated destruction of P500,000. No casualties were reported.

Curriculum

Junior high school 

Special Program in the Arts
Strengthening Technical Vocational Educational Program
Information and Communication Technology
Science Technology Engineering and Mathematics

Senior High School 

 Technical Vocational Livelihood
 Shielded Metal Arc Welding (SMAW)
 Electrical Installation and Maintenance (EIM)
 Electric Power Assisted Steering (EPAS)
 Dressmaking
 Cookery
 Food and Beverages Services (FBS)
 Bread and Pastry
 Computer System Servicing (CSS)
 Arts and Design
 Science Technology Engineering and Mathematics

Gallery

See also
Silay Institute
St. Theresita's Academy
Silay South Elementary School
La Purisima Concepcion Elementary School

References

External links
DMLMHS on Google+

Schools in Silay
High schools in Negros Occidental
Public schools in the Philippines